SM U-51 was a Type U 51 submarine, one of 329 submarines in the Imperial German Navy in World War I. She engaged in commerce warfare during the First Battle of the Atlantic.

She was ordered from Germaniawerft, at Kiel, on 23 August 1914 and laid down there on 19 December. She was launched on 25 November 1915 and commissioned on 24 February 1916. Kapitänleutnant Walter Rumpel was her captain for her entire career.

Operations
Completed at Kiel about March 1916, she carried out trials at Kiel School until the end of April when she proceeded to Heligoland. British Naval Intelligence (better known as Room 40): monitored and recorded her activities. She was again in the North Sea between 16 May and 3 June 1916, during the Battle of Jutland. She fired two torpedoes at the British battleship , but missed her.

On 14 July the British submarine  spotted U-51 leaving the Ems and torpedoed her. U-51 sank with the loss of 34 of her crew; four survivors were rescued.

The wreck of U-51 was raised and broken up in 1968.

References

Notes

Citations

Bibliography

Type U 51 submarines
U-boats commissioned in 1916
World War I submarines of Germany
1915 ships
Maritime incidents in 1916
U-boats sunk in 1916
World War I shipwrecks in the North Sea
U-boats sunk by British submarines
Ships built in Kiel